Tour de Singkarak (abbreviated TdS) is an annual professional road bicycle racing stage race held in West Sumatra, Indonesia, and named after the Lake Singkarak. First staged in 2009, Tour de Singkarak is classified by the Union Cycling International (UCI) as a 2.2 category race as part of the UCI Asia Tour. It covers more than 1267 kilometres — from/to Padang passing around lake Singkarak and runs through inland West Sumatran cities — and lasted for a week and held annually. This exciting tour across the picturesque West Sumatra countryside`s scenic landscapes, comprising beaches, blue lakes, and numerous hairpin bends, as they climb up to the foot of the volcanoes. The total prize money is IDR 1,000,000,000 (US$100,000). BNI-Maybank was the platinum sponsor of the Tour De Singkarak since 2009 with the Ministry of Culture and Tourism of Indonesia. TDS is the biggest international cycling race in Indonesia, having the fifth largest audience in the world, it attracted many top international cyclists to participate in this world famous annual sports event.

Past winners

Tour de Singkarak 2009
Tour de Singkarak 2009 was held for the first time in 29 April to 3 May 2009 under full sponsorship of Ministry of Culture and Tourism of Indonesia in order to promote tourism in West Sumatra. Tour de Singkarak 2009 attracted teams from 15 countries. The race covers 459 kilometres in five stages, lasted for seven days with total prize money 600 million rupiah.

Stages
 Stage 1 Padang: 15.8 kilometres, start in Taman Budaya Padang.
 Stage 2a Padang—Pariaman: 84.5 kilometres
 Stage 2b, Pariaman— Muko-muko/Lake Maninjau : 90.6 kilometres
 Stage 3 Lake Maninjau—Bukittinggi: 51.3 kilometres
 Stage 4 Padangpanjang—Sawahlunto: 88.2 kilometres, start in front of Jam Gadang through Pagaruyung Palace
 Stage 5 Sawahlunto—Batusangkar: 102.4 kilometres
 Stage 6 Bukittinggi—Solok: 244.6 kilometres around Lake Singkarak.

Teams

  
  Aisan Racing Team
  Polygon Sweet Nice
  Bike Bug North Sydney-Carroll & O’Dea Lawyers
  7 Eleven Racing Team By Road Bike Philippines
  OCBC Singapore Continental Cycling Team
  Malaysia (national team)
  
  CCN Collosi
  KSPO Cycling Team
  
  United Bike Kencana Tim
  Dodol Picnic Garut
  Kutai Kartanegara Cycling Club
  Arraya Indonesia
  Bintang Kranggan Cycling Club
  Custom Cycling Club
  Komunitas Sepeda Sumatera Barat
  Putera Perjuangan Bandung
  Pengurus Provinsi ISSI Sumatera Barat
  Pengurus Provinsi ISSI Yogyakarta.

Tour de Singkarak 2010
Tour de Singkarak 2010 was held in 1–6 June 2010, joined by 12 foreign teams and 10 Indonesian teams. The race covers the total distance 551.7 kilometres in six stages. The tour was sponsored by Ministry of Culture and Tourism of Indonesia with support from West Sumatran cities and regencies (kabupaten).

Stages
 Stage 1 Padang
 Stage 2 Padang—Pariaman
 Stage 3 Pariaman—Bukittinggi
 Stage 4 Bukittinggi—Payakumbuh
 Stage 5 Payakumbuh—Sawahlunto
 Stage 6a Sawahlunto—Pagaruyung Palace
 Stage 6b Pagaruyung—Padang Panjang
 Stage 7 Padang Panjang—Lake Singkarak

Tour de Singkarak 2011
Tour de Singkarak 2011 was held in 6–12 June 2011, covers 743.5 kilometres in seven stages across 12 cities and regencies in West Sumatra. Several tourism spots were crossed in this edition, such as Arau valley, Lake Maninjau, Kelok 44, and twin lakes Lake Diatas and Lake Dibawah.

Tour de Singkarak 2012

Tour de Singkarak 2012 was held on 3 June 2012, covers 856 kilometres in seven stages which the routes has been surveyed by Amaury Sport Organization which surveyed also Tour de France routes.

Stages
 Stage 1 Sawahlunto—Muaro Sijunjung—Sawahlunto
 Stage 2 Sawahlunto—Arau Payakumbuh
 Stage 3 Payakumbuh—Pagaruyung Palace
 Stage 4 Pagaruyung—Malibo Anai—Kelok 44—Bukittinggi
 Stage 5 Padang Panjang—Solok
 Stage 6 Gandoriah Beach—Pesisir Selatan
 Stage 7 Pesisir Selatan—Padang

Tour de Singkarak 2013
Tour de Singkarak 2013 is the fifth TDS held on 2–9 June 2013, covers 1181,6 kilometres in seven stages, participated by cyclists from 25 countries.

Stages
 Stage 1 Bukittinggi - Bonjol
 Stage 2 Padang Panjang - Tanah Datar
 Stage 3 Payakumbuh - Danau Singkarak
 Stage 4 Sijunjung - Dharmasraya
 Stage 5 Sawahlunto - Solok Selatan
 Stage 6 Pariaman - Pesisir Selatan
 Stage 7 Padang Pariaman - Padang

Tour de Singkarak 2014
In the sixth Tour de Singkarak which ran in 7 to 15 June 2014, the tour route was 1,250 kilometers through 18 regencies. The number of participants reached around 160 riders from 20 teams

Tour de Singkarak 2015
Tour de Singkarak 2015 is the 7th race held on 3 October to 10 October 2015. Total 24 teams took part, 5 of them came from Indonesia.

Teams

  7 Eleven Roadbike 
  Aisian Racing Team 
 Arbo Denzel Cliff
  Attaque Team Gusto 
  Bridgestone Anchor Cycling Team 
  Holy Brother Cycling Team 
  Kinan Cycling Team 
  National Sports Council
  Pegasus Continental Cycling Team 
  Pishgaman Giant Team

  Shimano Racing Team 
  Singaha Infinite Cycling Team 
  ST. George Merida Cycling Team 
  Tabriz Petrochemical Team 
 Team Diferdance Gigi Losch 
 Terengganu Cycling Team 
  Track Team Astana (Kazakastan)
  Uzbekistan National Team (Uzbekistan)
  Persatuan Besar Ikatan Sepeda Sport Indonesia

Tour de Singkarak 2016
Tour de Singkarak was held from 6 to 14 August. The race features 23 cycling teams, 18 international were and five Indonesian. The international cycling teams were from Malaysia, Singapore, Laos, Taiwan, Japan, Switzerland, Korea, Australia, Iran, the United Arab Emirates, the Philippines, Hong Kong, and Kenya.  A  total 230 participants explored eight stages of the 1,102 kilometer track.

Teams

  St. George Merida
  Cisco Racing Team p/b Scody
  HKSI Pro Cycling Team
  Pegasus Cycling Team
  Indonesia National Team
  CCC Indonesia
  BRCC Banyuwangi
  BBC Pessel Bank Nagari Sumbar
  KFC Cycling Team
  Pishgaman Cycling Team

  Kinan Cycling Team
  Kenyan Riders Downunder
  Korail Cycling Team
  Black Inc Cycling Team
  Terengganu Cycling Team
  7 Eleven Sava RVP
  Singha Infinite
  Action Cycling Team
  Sharjah Cycling Team

Tour de Singkarak 2017
The event was held from 18 to 26 November 2017, and cyclists from 29 countries took part.
The race was divided into nine stages,
Stage 1:Tanah Datar - Padang with the travel distance of 107 kilometers, 
Stage 2: Painan – Sawahlunto (166 kilometers), 
Stage 3: Muaro Sijunjung – Punjung Island (100 kilometers), 
Stage 4: Singkarak Lake – Payakumbuh (135 kilometers), 
Stage 5: Harau Valley – Padang Panjang (101 kilometers), 
Stage 6: Solok – South Padang Aro Solok (140 kilometers), 
Stage 7: Pariaman – West Pasaman (157 kilometers), 
Stage 8: Padang Pariaman – Agam (101 kilometers), and
Stage 9:  Pasaman – Bukittinggi (90 kilometers).

Tour de Singkarak 2018
2018 Tour de Singkarak was held from 4–11 November, marks its 10th anniversary. Twenty one cycling teams from 26 countries, including four domestic teams and one local team, will participate. This year is extended to 1,267 kilometers (km), from 1,250 km in the previous 2017 TDS, covers 16 districts and cities.

Stages
The event was held in eight stages, 
Stage 1: Bukittinggi-Sijunjung, stretching 140.5 km,
Stage 2: Sawahlunto- Dharmasraya, covering a total distance of 204.1 km,
Stage 3: Singkarak-Tanah Datar, stretching 150.4 km,
Stage 4: Padang-Agam,
Stage 5: Limapuluh Kota-Pasaman, 170.5 km,
Stage 6: Solok-Payakumbuh, 105 km,
Stage 7: Padangpanjang-South Solok, 194.4 km, and
Stage 8/Final: South Pesisir to Pariaman, stretching 158 km.

Teams
114 cyclists from 20 teams participated in the first stage of TdS 2018.

  Matrix Powertag of Japan
  
  Sapura Cycling Team
  Interpro Stradalli Cycling
  LX Cycling Team
  Nex- CCN
  7 Eleven Sava RVP
  McDonalds Downunder 
 St. George Continental
  Forca Amskins
  PGN Cycling Team
  Padang Road Bike BNI
  Advan CCC Indonesia
  BRCC Banyuwangi
  KFC Cycling Team
  
  
  Thai Continental/Thai National Team
  Bike Aid 
  Java Partizan
 PCS-CCN

Tour de Singkarak 2019
2019 Tour de Singkarak covers 1,362 kilometers in West Sumatra and Jambi provinces. Ninety-eight cyclists from 24 teams and 24 countries have signed up for the tournament, held November 3–10, 2019.

Stages
The event has 9 stages,
Stage 1: 107.3 km from Pariaman city to Tanah Datar regency.
Stage 2: 112.2 km from Pasaman regency to Bukittinggi city.
Stage 3: stretches 129.9 km from Lembah Harau valley (Limapuluh Kota regency) to Padang Panjang city, 
Stage 4: comprise 205.3 km from Dharmasraya regency to Sawahlunto city, 
Stage 5: 206.5 km ride from Payakumbuh city to Ambun Pagi (Agam regency), 
Stage 6 : 214.1 km from Dermaga Singkarak Dock (Solok regency) to Padang Aro (South Solok regency),
Stage 7: 82.9 km from Kayu Aro (Kerinci regency) to Dermaga Danau Kerinci Dock (Kerinci regency of Jambi), 
Stage 8: 212.9 km from Kota Sungai Penuh (Jambi) to Painan (South Pesisir regency of West Sumatra),
Stage 9: 107.7 km from Carocok Beach (South Pesisir regency, West Sumatra) to Padang.

External links
 
 
 Statistics at the-sports.org
 Tour de Singkarak at cqranking.com

References

 
Cycle races in Indonesia
UCI Asia Tour races
Annual sporting events in Indonesia
Recurring sporting events established in 2009
2009 establishments in Indonesia
Tourist attractions in West Sumatra
Sport in West Sumatra